William Estcourt was the member of Parliament for the constituency of Cirencester for the parliament of 1584.

References 

Members of Parliament for Cirencester
Year of birth unknown
Year of death unknown
English MPs 1584–1585